Lake Yosemite is an artificial freshwater lake located approximately  east of Merced, California, in the rolling Sierra Foothills. The university is bounded by the lake on one side, and two canals (Fairfield Canal and Le Grand Canal) run through the campus.

Operation
Lake Yosemite is a reservoir built in 1888 for irrigation purposes. It is currently owned and operated by Merced Irrigation District, which supplies irrigation water to farms in Merced County. Recreation on the lake is managed by the Merced County Parks and Recreation Department.

Recreation
All boating is permitted, including jet skis and water skiing. The lake is equipped with boat launches.  Swimming is allowed only in certain designated areas. Swimming outside of these areas is strictly prohibited and could result in a citation. A  kayak/SUP rental business (The Padyak Shack) is in operation and has a friendly and knowledgeable staff. 

Onshore, shaded picnic areas, which feature picnic tables, barbecue pits, restrooms, and a small playground, are available.

Lake Yosemite Sailing Association
The lake is home to the Lake Yosemite Sailing Association (LYSA), which was founded in 1988 and currently has more than 90 members. The LYSA hosts club sailboat races at Lake Yosemite Thursday evenings during the summer months and also organizes sailing trips to nearby lakes and bays in California.
Lake Yosemite Sailing Association also conducts Youth Sail camps during the summer months, teaching and training the next generation of sailors.

Alleged paranormal phenomena
The lake's tower is said to be haunted by the "Lady of the Lake". According to the horror stories, the ghost has long flowing white hair and wears a long white gown. She is said to walk around the tower catwalk and on the lake's surface looking for her lost child or lover. The ghost has also been reported to walk along Old Lake Road, occasionally stepping into the path of oncoming traffic.

Photos

See also
 Lake McClure
 List of lakes in California
 San Luis Reservoir

References
FishersNet Fishin' Maps - Lake Yosemite
Merced Irrigation District - Irrigation Facts
Merced Irrigation District - Water Shed Map
USGS/Trails.com - Topographic Map Reservoir Features in Merced County, California

Footnotes

External links
Lake Yosemite Website
Lake Yosemite Sailing Association
Merced County Parks and Recreation Department
Merced Irrigation District

Yosemite
Yosemite
Yosemite